The Coalition of the Willing may refer to:

 Coalition of the willing, a post-1990 political phrase
 The Coalition of the Willing (album), a 2006 album by Bobby Previte
 The Coalition of the Willing (band), an instrumental ensemble led by Bobby Previte
 "Coalition of the Willing" (Jericho episode), a television episode

See also

 
 Coalition (disambiguation)
 Willing (disambiguation)